Roller skates, are shoes or bindings that fit onto shoes that are worn to enable the wearer to roll along on wheels. The first roller skate was an inline skate design, effectively an ice skate with wheels replacing the blade. Later the "quad skate" style became more popular, consisting of four wheels arranged in the same configuration as a typical car.

Roller skating is a hobby, sport, and mode of transportation using roller skates.

History 

While the first reported use of wheeled skates was on a London stage in 1743, the first patented "roller skate" was introduced in 1760 by Belgian inventor John Joseph Merlin. They were hard to steer and stopping was difficult due to the fact that they did not have any type of braking mechanism and as such they failed to gain popularity. Merlin demonstrated his invention during a party in the city of Huy, during which he skated while playing the violin.

In the 1840s, Meyerbeer's opera Le prophète featured a scene in which performers used roller-skates to simulate ice-skating on a frozen lake set on stage. This exposure had an impact on audiences and led to the rise of roller skating as a new and popular activity throughout the Continent. As ice skaters subsequently developed the art of figure skating, roller skaters wanted the ability to turn in their skates in a similar fashion.

In 1863, James Plimpton from Massachusetts invented the "rocking" skate and used a four-wheel configuration for stability, and independent axles that turned by pressing to one side of the skate or the other when the skater wants to create an edge. This was a vast improvement on the Merlin design, one that was easier to use and drove the huge popularity of roller skating, dubbed  "rinkomania" in the 1860s and 1870s, which spread to Europe and around the world, and continued through the 1930s. The Plimpton skate is still used today                                                                                                                     

Eventually, roller skating evolved from just a pastime to a competitive sport; speed skating, racing on skates, and inline figure skating, very similar to what can be seen in the Olympics on ice. In the mid 1990s roller hockey, played with a ball rather than a puck, became so popular that it even made an appearance in the Olympics in 1992. The National Sporting Goods Association statistics showed, from a 1999 study, that 2.5 million people played roller hockey. Roller skating was considered for the 2012 Summer Olympics but has never become an Olympic event. Other roller skating sports include jam skating and roller derby.

Roller skating popularity exploded during the disco era but tapered off in the 1980s and 1990s. Sales of roller skates increased during the COVID-19 pandemic as people sought safe outdoor activities.

Roller skating saw a revival in the late 2010s and early 2020s, spurred on by a number of viral videos on the popular video sharing app TikTok. Many popular brands sold out to the point of back-order, with many people taking up the hobby during COVID-19 quarantines across the globe.

Organizations 

The Roller Skating Rink Operators Association was developed in the U.S. in 1937. It is currently named the Roller Skating Association. The association promotes roller skating and offers classes to the public, aiming to educate the population about roller skating. Its current president is Bobby Pender and the associations headquarters are located in Indianapolis.

Gallery

Health benefits
The Roller Skating Association's web page offers some health benefits of roller skating. Some of the benefits they list include:
 Providing a complete aerobic workout 
 Burning 330 calories per hour while skating  for a 143-pound person or 600 calories while skating . 
 A study from the University of Massachusetts found that in-line skating causes less than 50% of the impact shock to joints compared to running. 
 Roller skating is equivalent to jogging in terms of health benefits
 The American Heart Association recommends roller skating as an aerobic fitness sport.

See  also
 Ice skates
 Inline skates
 Rollerblade – a popular brand of inline skates
 Roller shoe
 Roller skating

References

External links

 "How Rink Rollers Are Made", by George W. Waltz – November 1951 article in Popular Science on how roller skates are manufactured
 Court Case Brought by Roller Skating Rinks About Taxes
 History of Roller Skating in Canada
 homepage for USA Roller Sports
 Roller Skating Museum

 
Belgian inventions
Sports footwear
Roller skating equipment
Land vehicles
Wheeled vehicles
1970s fads and trends
2020s fads and trends
TikTok